Erastia is a fungal genus in the family Polyporaceae. It is a monotypic genus, containing the single European species Erastia salmonicolor. Erastia was circumscribed by Finnish mycologists Tuomo Niemelä and Juha Kinnunen in 2005. It is named in honour of the Estonian mycologist Erast Parmasto, "the eminent researcher of fungal taxonomy and cladistics".

References

Polyporaceae
Monotypic Polyporales genera
Taxa described in 2005
Fungi of Europe